The 1989 Lipton International Players Championships was a tennis tournament played on outdoor hard courts. It was the 5th edition of the Miami Masters and was part of the 1989 Nabisco Grand Prix and of Category 5 of the 1989 WTA Tour. The tournament took place at the Tennis Center at Crandon Park in Key Biscayne, Florida in the United States from March 20 through April 3, 1989.

Finals

Men's singles

 Ivan Lendl defeated  Thomas Muster by walkover
 It was Lendl's 3rd title of the year and the 82nd of his career.
 Muster could not play the final because he was hit by a drunk driver on the eve of the final.

Women's singles

 Gabriela Sabatini defeated  Chris Evert 6–1, 4–6, 6–2
 It was Sabatini's 1st title of the year and the 19th of her career.

Men's doubles

 Jakob Hlasek /  Anders Järryd defeated  Jim Grabb /  Patrick McEnroe 6–3 (Grabb and McEnroe retired)
 It was Hlasek's 3rd title of the year and the 9th of his career. It was Järryd's 1st title of the year and the 43rd of his career.

Women's doubles

 Jana Novotná /  Helena Suková defeated  Gigi Fernández /  Lori McNeil 7–6(7–5), 6–4
 It was Novotná's 4th title of the year and the 16th of her career. It was Suková's 4th title of the year and the 36th of her career.

External links 
 Official website
 ATP tournament profile
 WTA tournament profile